Los Angeles River Bikeway, also known as LARIO, is a  bikeway along the lower Los Angeles River in southern Los Angeles County, California. It is one of the completed sections of the Los Angeles River Bicycle Path planned to run along the entire  length of the LA River.

As any trail project along the LA River, it is part of the National Park Service Juan Bautista de Anza National Historic Trail.

Route
The paved bikeway runs from the Shoreline Pedestrian Bikepath at the river's mouth in Long Beach, upstream to the industrial area southeast of Downtown Los Angeles, at Atlantic Boulevard in Vernon. Going upriver, it passes through the river channel adjacent sections of West Long Beach, North Long Beach, East Compton, East Rancho Dominguez, Paramount, Lynwood, Downey, Cudahy, Bell Gardens, Bell, and Maywood.

In Long Beach, the bike path runs on the east side of the river channel. When the path intersects with Imperial Highway, it crosses the LA River on the road bridge and continues north on along the west side of the LA River to Vernon. The path on the east side continues under the bridge to the confluence with the Rio Hondo, becoming the Rio Hondo Bicycle Path heading northeast to the Whittier Narrows Recreation Area.

Mileage markers are painted on the pavement and signs are posted at regular intervals detailing upcoming city streets.

Parking can be found at Hollydale Park in South Gate, Ralph C. Dills Park in  Paramount,  and DeForest Park in Long Beach.  Other access in Long Beach includes several street crossings of the river, including those of Pacific Coast Highway, Willow Street, Wardlow Road, and Del Amo Boulevard.

History
“RIO” in the name LARIO is río, i.e. river in Spanish.

Stakeholders involved in creating the Los Angeles River Bikeway have been (at various times): “the Santa Monica Conservancy, Friends of the Los Angeles River, the city of Los Angeles, the county of Los Angeles, advisory committees and task forces, the Los Angeles City Council, various state propositions (generally  serving as funding sources) and the U.S. Army Corps of Engineers.

See also
 CicLAvia
 Shoreline Pedestrian Bikepath
 San Gabriel River Bike Trail
Los Angeles River bicycle path — for all sections along the Los Angeles River.

References

External links
 laparks.org: LA River Bike Trail MAP

Bike paths in Los Angeles
Los Angeles River
Transportation in Long Beach, California
Bell, California
Bell Gardens, California
Downey, California
Lynwood, California
Maywood, California
Paramount, California
Vernon, California
Tourist attractions in Long Beach, California